Richard Whately (1 February 1787 – 8 October 1863) was an English academic, rhetorician, logician, philosopher, economist, and theologian who also served as a reforming Church of Ireland Archbishop of Dublin. He was a leading Broad Churchman, a prolific and combative author over a wide range of topics, a flamboyant character, and one of the first reviewers to recognise the talents of Jane Austen.

Life and times

He was born in London, the son of the Rev. Dr. Joseph Whately (1730–1797). He was educated at a private school near Bristol, and at Oriel College, Oxford, from 1805. He obtained a B.A. in 1808, with double second-class honours, and the prize for the English essay in 1810; in 1811 he was elected Fellow of Oriel, and in 1814 took holy orders. After graduation he acted as a private tutor, in particular to Nassau William Senior who became a close friend, and to Samuel Hinds.

Early married life
After his marriage to writer Elizabeth Whately ( Pope) in 1821, Whately lived in Oxford. He had had to give up his college fellowship, which could not be held by married men, and at this period lived by tutoring and his pen. An uncle, William Plumer, presented him with a living, Halesworth in Suffolk; in August 1822 Whately moved there. Two of his daughters were writer Jane Whately and missionary Mary Louisa Whately. In 1825, he was appointed principal of St. Alban Hall, a position obtained for him by his mentor Edward Copleston, who wanted to raise the notoriously low academic standards at the Hall, which was also a target for expansion by Oriel. Whately returned to Oxford, though giving up only in 1831 the Suffolk living, where he had seen the social effects of unemployment.

A reformer, Whately was initially on friendly terms with John Henry Newman. They fell out over Robert Peel's candidacy for the Oxford University seat in Parliament. 

In 1829 Whately was elected as Drummond Professor of Political Economy at Oxford in succession to Nassau William Senior. His tenure of office was cut short by his appointment to the archbishopric of Dublin in 1831. He published only one course of Introductory Lectures in two editions (1831 & 1832).

Archbishop of Dublin
Whately's appointment by Lord Grey to the see of Dublin came as a political surprise. The aged Henry Bathurst had turned the post down. The new Whig administration found Whately, well known at Holland House and effective in a parliamentary committee appearance speaking on tithes, an acceptable option. Behind the scenes Thomas Hyde Villiers had lobbied Denis Le Marchant on his behalf, with the Brougham Whigs. The appointment was challenged in the House of Lords, but without success.

In Ireland, Whately's bluntness and his lack of a conciliatory manner caused opposition from his own clergy, and from the beginning he gave offence by supporting state endowment of the Catholic clergy. He enforced strict discipline in his diocese; and he published a statement of his views on Sabbath (Thoughts on the Sabbath, 1832). He lived in Redesdale House in Kilmacud, just outside Dublin, where he could garden. He was concerned to reform the Church of Ireland and the Irish Poor Laws. He considered tithe commutation essential for the Church.

Irish national education 1831 to 1853
In 1831, Whately attempted to establish a national and non-sectarian system of education in Ireland, on the basis of common instruction for Protestants and Catholics alike in literary and moral subjects, religious instruction being taken apart. 

In 1841, Catholic archbishops William Crolly and John MacHale debated whether to continue the system, with the more moderate Crolly supporting Whately's gaining papal permission to go on, given some safeguards. In 1852, the scheme broke down due to the opposition of the new ultramontanist Catholic archbishop of Dublin, Paul Cullen, who would later become the first Irish prelate named Cardinal. Whately withdrew from the Education Board the following year.

Later life
During the famine years of 1846 and 1847 the archbishop and his family tried to alleviate the miseries of the people. On 27 March 1848, Whately became a member of the Canterbury Association. He was elected a Foreign Honorary Member of the American Academy of Arts and Sciences in 1855.

From 1856 onwards symptoms of decline began to manifest themselves in a paralytic affection of Whately's left side. Still he continued his public duties.

Death

In the summer of 1863 Whately was prostrated by an ulcer in the leg, and after several months of acute suffering he died on 8 October 1863.

Works
Whately was a prolific writer, a successful expositor and Protestant apologist in works that ran to many editions and translations. His Elements of Logic (1826) was drawn from an article "Logic" in the Encyclopædia Metropolitana. The companion article on "Rhetoric" provided Elements of Rhetoric (1828). In these two works Whately introduced erotetic logic.

In 1825 Whately published a series of Essays on Some of the Peculiarities of the Christian Religion, followed in 1828 by a second series On some of the Difficulties in the Writings of St Paul, and in 1830 by a third On the Errors of Romanism traced to their Origin in Human Nature. In 1837 he wrote his handbook of Christian Evidences, which was translated during his lifetime into more than a dozen languages. In the Irish context, the Christian Evidences was adapted to a form acceptable to Catholic beliefs, with the help of James Carlile.

Selective listing
Whately's works included: 

1819 Historic Doubts relative to Napoleon Buonaparte, a jeu d'ésprit directed against excessive scepticism as applied to the Gospel history
1822 On the Use and Abuse of Party Spirit in Matters of Religion (Bampton Lectures)
1825 Essays on Some of the Peculiarities of the Christian Religion
1826 Elements of Logic
1828 Elements of Rhetoric
1828 On some of the Difficulties in the Writings of St Paul
1830 On the Errors of Romanism traced to their Origin in Human Nature
1831 Introductory Lectures on Political Economy, 1st ed. (London: B. Fellowes). Eight lectures.
1832 Introductory Lectures on Political Economy, 2nd ed. (London: B. Fellowes). Nine lectures and appendix.
1832 A view of the Scripture revelations concerning a future state: lectures advancing belief in Christian mortalism.
1832 Thoughts on the Sabbath
1836 Charges and Tracts
1839 Essays on Some of the Dangers to Christian Faith
1841 The Kingdom of Christ
1845 onwards "Easy Lessons": on Reasoning, On Morals, On Mind, and on the British Constitution

(Linked works are from Internet Archive)

Editor

 William Wake (1866) Treatises of Predestination, 
 Francis Bacon (1858) Bacon's Essays with Annotations, See Essays (Francis Bacon)
 William Paley: (1837) [1796] A View of the Evidences of Christianity, in three parts
 William Paley: Moral Philosophy.

Character
Humphrey Lloyd told Caroline Fox that Whately's eccentric behaviour and body language was exacerbated in Dublin by a sycophantic circle of friends. He was a great talker, a wit, and loved punning. In Oxford his white hat, rough white coat, and huge white dog earned for him the sobriquet of the White Bear, and he exhibited the exploits of his climbing dog in Christ Church Meadow.

Views
A member of the loose group called the Oriel Noetics, Whately supported religious liberty, civil rights, and freedom of speech for dissenters, Roman Catholics, Jews, and even atheists. He took the line that the civil disabilities imposed on non-Anglicans made the state only nominally Christian, and supported disestablishment. He was a follower of Edward Copleston, regarded as the founder of the Noetics taken as apologists for the orthodoxy of the Church of England. 

A devout Christian, Whately took a practical view of Christianity. He disagreed with the Evangelical party and generally favoured a more intellectual approach to religion. He also disagreed with the later Tractarian emphasis on ritual and church authority. Instead, he emphasised careful reading and understanding of the Bible.

His cardinal principle was that of Chillingworth —‘the Bible, and the Bible alone, is the religion of protestants;’ and his exegesis was directed to determine the general tenor of the scriptures to the exclusion of dogmas based on isolated texts. There is no reason to question his reception of the central doctrines of the faith, though he shrank from theorising or even attempting to formulate them with precision. On election he held, broadly speaking, the Arminian view, and his antipathy to Calvinism was intense. He dwelt more on the life than on the death of Christ, the necessity of which he denied.

Whately took a view of political economy as an essentially logical subject. It proved influential in Oxford. The Noetics were reformers but largely centrist in politics, rather than strong Whigs or Tories. One of Whately's initial acts on going to Dublin was to endow a chair of political economy in Trinity College. Its first holder was Mountifort Longfield. Later, in 1846, he founded the Dublin Statistical Society with William Neilson Hancock.

Whately's view of political economy, and that common to the early holders of the Trinity college professorship, addressed it as a type of natural theology. He belonged to the group of supporters of Thomas Malthus that included Thomas Chalmers, some others of the Noetics, Richard Jones and William Whewell from Cambridge. He saw no inconsistency between science and Christian belief, differing in that way from some Christian critics of Malthus. He differed also from Jones and Whewell, expressing the view that the inductive method was of less use for political economy than the deductive method, properly applied.

In periodicals Whately discussed other public questions. He addressed, for example, the subject of transportation and the "secondary punishments" on those who had been transported; his pamphlet on this topic influenced the politicians Lord John Russell and Henry George Grey.

Legacy
Whately was an important figure in the revival of Aristotelian logic in the early nineteenth century. The Elements of Logic gave an impetus to the study of logic in Britain, and in the United States of America, logician Charles Sanders Peirce (1839–1914) wrote that his lifelong fascination with logic began when he read Whately's Elements as a 12-year-old boy.

Whately's view of rhetoric as essentially a method for persuasion became an orthodoxy, challenged in mid-century by Henry Noble Day. Elements of Rhetoric is still cited, for thought about presumption, burden of proof, and testimony.

In 1864 Jane Whately, his daughter, published Miscellaneous Remains from his commonplace book and in 1866 his Life and Correspondence in two volumes. The Anecdotal Memoirs of Archbishop Whately, by William John Fitzpatrick, was published in 1864.

Family
Whately married Elizabeth Pope (third daughter of William Pope, born 7 October and baptised 22 December 1795 at Hillingdon, Middlesex) at Cheltenham on 3 July 1821. She later authored some Christian literature herself, dying 25 April 1860. Her younger sister Charlotte married Baden Powell in 1837.

They had four daughters and a son, including:

(Elizabeth) Jane Whately (1822–1893), a religious author;
Edward William Whately, a cleric;
Mary Louisa Whately (1824–1889), a medical missionary in Egypt;
Henrietta, who married in 1848 Charles Brent Wale, a barrister, son of Sir Charles Wale;
The youngest daughter Blanche, friend of Mary Rosse, married George Wale R.N., brother of Charles Brent Wale, in 1859, and died in March 1860.

A programme in the BBC television series Who Do You Think You Are?, broadcast on 2 March 2009, uncovered that Richard Whately was an ancestor of British actor Kevin Whately.

Notes and references

Citations

Sources
 

Attribution

Further reading
A modern biography is Richard Whately: A Man for All Seasons by Craig Parton . See also Donald Harman Akenson A Protestant in Purgatory: Richard Whately, Archbishop of Dublin (South Bend, Indiana 1981)

Einhorn, Lois J. "Consistency in Richard Whately: The Scope of His Rhetoric." Philosophy & Rhetoric 14 (Spring 1981): 89–99. 
Einhorn, Lois J. "Richard Whately's Public Persuasion: The Relationship between His Rhetorical Theory and His Rhetorical Practice." Rhetorica 4 (Winter 1986): 47–65. 
Einhorn, Lois J. "Did Napoleon Live? Presumption and Burden of Proof in Richard Whately's Historic Doubts Relative to Napoleon Boneparte." Rhetoric Society Quarterly 16 (1986): 285–97.
Giustino, David de. "Finding an archbishop: the Whigs and Richard Whately in 1831." Church History 64 (1995): 218–36.
McKerrow, Ray E. "Richard Whately: Religious Controversialist of the Nineteenth Century." Prose Studies: 1800–1900 2 (1979): 160–87. 
McKerrow, Ray E. "Archbishop Whately: Human Nature and Christian Assistance." Church History 50.2 (1981): 166–189. 
McKerrow, Ray E. "Richard Whately on the Nature of Human Knowledge in Relation to the Ideas of his Contemporaries." Journal of the History of Ideas 42.3 (1981): 439–455. 
McKerrow, Ray E. "Richard Whately's Theory of Rhetoric." In Explorations in Rhetoric. ed. R. McKerrow. Glenview IL: Scott, Firesman, & Co., 1982.
McKerrow, Ray E. "Richard Whately and the Revival of Logic in Nineteenth-Century England." Rhetorica 5 (Spring 1987): 163–85. 
McKerrow, Ray E. "Whately's Philosophy of Language." The Southern Speech Communication Journal 53 (1988): 211–226.
Poster, Carol. "Richard Whately and the Didactic Sermon." The History of the Sermon: The Nineteenth Century. Ed. Robert Ellison. Leiden: Brill, 2010: 59–113.
Poster, Carol. "An Organon for Theology: Whately's Rhetoric and Logic in Religious Context". Rhetorica 24:1 (2006): 37–77.
Sweet, William. "Paley, Whately, and 'enlightenment evidentialism'". International Journal for Philosophy of Religion 45 (1999):143-166.

External links 

 
 
 Works by Richard Whately at Google Books
 Introductory Lectures on Political Economy
  New School: Richard Whately

1787 births
1863 deaths
English logicians
19th-century British economists
Alumni of Oriel College, Oxford
Fellows of Oriel College, Oxford
Principals of St Alban Hall, Oxford
English rhetoricians
Anglican archbishops of Dublin
Burials at St Patrick's Cathedral, Dublin
Fellows of the American Academy of Arts and Sciences
Members of the Canterbury Association
Members of the Privy Council of Ireland
English philosophers
Statistical and Social Inquiry Society of Ireland
Drummond Professors of Political Economy
19th-century English Anglican priests
Anglican philosophers